Chasmistes is a genus of ray-finned fish in the family Catostomidae.

They are native to freshwater habitats in the Western United States.

Several species are seriously threatened, and one has become extinct in recent history (a second extinct species has only been known from fossils).

Characteristics 
Members of this genus have a large and stout body, as well as a large head. They often have a hump on their snout. Their mouths are either terminal or subterminal. They have a complete lateral line and a two-chambered gas bladder.

Species
The genus Chasmistes contains these species:
 Chasmistes brevirostris Cope, 1879 — shortnose sucker
 Chasmistes cujus Cope, 1883 — cui-ui
 Chasmistes fecundus (Cope & Yarrow, 1875) — Webug sucker
 Chasmistes liorus D. S. Jordan, 1878 — June sucker
 Chasmistes liorus liorus D. S. Jordan, 1878 
 Chasmistes liorus mictus R. R. Miller & G. R. Smith, 1981
 †Chasmistes muriei R. R. Miller & G. R. Smith, 1981 — Snake River sucker
 †Chasmistes spatulifer R. R. Miller  & G. R. Smith, 1967

References

Catostomidae
Fish of the Western United States
Freshwater fish of the United States
Endemic fauna of the United States
Taxa named by David Starr Jordan 
Taxonomy articles created by Polbot